The E9 is a , A1A-A1A passenger train-hauling diesel locomotive built by General Motors' Electro-Motive Division of La Grange, Illinois, between April 1954 and January 1964. 100 cab-equipped A units were produced and 44 cabless booster B units, all for service in the United States. The E9 was the tenth and last model of EMD E-unit and differed from the earlier E8 as built only by the newer engines and a different, flusher-fitting mounting for the headlight glass, the latter being the only visible difference. Since some E8s were fitted with this, it is not a reliable way to distinguish the two. The E9 has two , V12 model 567C engines, each engine driving one generator to power two traction motors.

Engine and powertrain
Two D.C. generators, one per engine, provide power to four motors, two on each truck, in an A1A-A1A arrangement. This truck design was used on all E units and on MP 7100 and CB&Q 9908 power cars. EMD has built all of its major components since 1939.

Operation 
The E9 powered American passenger and mail trains from the 1950s into the late 1970s. Many of America's finest trains — such as Union Pacific Railroad's "City" fleet, Burlington's "Zephyr" fleet and Southern Pacific Railroad's Coast Daylight and Sunset Limited — had E9s pulling them. E9s and their E7 and E8 kin ran throughout the country on lesser-known passenger trains, Chicago's network of commuter trains and many mail and express trains. As America's passenger train network shrank due to unprofitability, Union Pacific, Rock Island and Illinois Central  began using E9s on freight trains while Burlington Northern and Chicago and North Western began upgrading their fleets of E9's with Head-end power and EMD 645 power assemblies for commuter operations in the Chicago metropolitan area into the early 1990's.

Amtrak, founded in 1971, bought 36 E9As and 23 E9Bs from the Union Pacific, Milwaukee Road, B&O and SCL. Amtrak used the E9s until 1979 and converted some E9B units to steam generator and head end power cars.

Original owners

Surviving examples
42 E9 locomotives survive today, donated to several museums and tourist railroads. A number of railroads keep a small number in service for hauling inspection specials, charter passenger trains, investor tours and other special trains.
Five E9s are owned by the Illinois Railway Museum, in Union, Illinois. The operating units are often used pulling trains within museum grounds.
The Union Pacific Railroad rosters three E9s: two A units, 951 and 949, and a B unit, 963B (built as UP E9B 970B), in their heritage fleet. They were rebuilt in 1993 with a single 2000 hp EMD 16-645E engine and upgraded electrical and control equipment for compatibility with more modern locomotives.
Southern Pacific 6051, the last surviving SP E9, is preserved at the California State Railroad Museum and operates excursions hosted by the museum.
CN owns and operates ex-Chicago, Burlington & Quincy E9A 9986A for its business train, painted in CN's heritage livery and numbered 103.
Milwaukee Road 32A is owned and operated by the Friends of the 261, who acquired it in 2019. This unit was previously used on the Wisconsin and Southern Railroad as their 101.

See also 

List of GM-EMD locomotives

References

Notes

Bibliography

 
 
 
 
 Reich, Sy (1973). Diesel Locomotive Rosters – The Railroad Magazine Series. Wayner Publications. No Library of Congress or ISBN.
 
 
 
 
 
 
 
 
 Extra 2200 South #43 November December 1973 Amtrak Roster by Dick Will p. 13
 Extra 2200 South #43 November December 1973 E8/E9 Roster and article by Dan Dover and Win Cuisinier (Preston Cook) pp. 14–24

External links 

 
 Illinois Railway Museum's Equipment roster (type "E9" and search the collection)
 Andrew Toppan's list
 The Union Pacific's trio of re-engined E9s

A1A-A1A locomotives
E9
Passenger locomotives
Diesel locomotives of the United States
Railway locomotives introduced in 1954
Locomotives with cabless variants
Standard gauge locomotives of the United States
Streamlined diesel locomotives